Morley Drive is a major east-west road in the inner northern suburbs of Perth, Western Australia, connecting the residential areas of Balcatta, Osborne Park, Tuart Hill, Nollamara, Yokine, Dianella, and Morley with major north-south arterial roads including Wanneroo Road, Alexander Drive, and Tonkin Highway.

Route description 
The road is part of State Route 76, which connects the coastal suburb of Trigg, Western Australia, with the Swan Valley in the east. Morley Drive runs through the following local government areas City of Stirling, City of Bayswater and City of Swan. The entire road is controlled by Main Roads Western Australia for its entire length, and is designated as part of the Karrinyup-Morley Highway (H28).

Morley Drive commences at a traffic light intersection with Main Street on the boundary of Balcatta and Tuart Hill, with Morley Drive continuing from Karrinyup Road west of the intersection.  further east, Morley Drive meets Wanneroo Road  and then travels along the suburbs of Nollamara and Yokine for  before intersecting with Flinders Street. The former two intersections are standard traffic light T-junctions, while the intersection with Alexander Drive and The Strand (north-west and south-east) is designed as a hamburger roundabout.

At Camboon and Wellington Roads, Morley Drive heads over into the City of Bayswater and the suburb of Morley. Morley Drive, and State Route 76, continue as Morley Drive East to Caversham and the Swan Valley.

History 
Morley Drive was first built during the 1970s to service the then-new inner northern suburbs of Perth. Before then, North Beach Drive was the main route to the coast in the west, as well as some similar situations in Morley, with Morley Drive being mostly discontinuous. Upon the opening of the road, which made the whole road continuous, the existing roads that were affected were made into discontinuous local roads. Also of note was Grand Promenade being cut off from what is known today as Dianella Drive. During the late 1980s, the six-way roundabout with Alexander Drive and the Strand was converted into a hamburger roundabout, resulting in The Strand becoming discontinuous. Morley Drive represented the northern terminus of the section of Tonkin Highway north of the Swan River from 1984 until 1989, when it was extended further north to Benara Road (Tonkin Highway became continuous in 1988).

Apart from minor modifications, Morley Drive remained relatively unchanged until 2010, when the terrain of the eastbound carriageway near McGilvray Avenue was lowered to improve road safety around that area. 2016, the Flinders Street intersection was upgraded with longer turning lanes and better pedestrian facilities. Between 2016 and 2018, as part of the NorthLink WA road project, the intersection with Tonkin Highway was upgraded to a roundabout interchange with Tonkin Highway free-flowing over Morley Drive, a first in WA.

Videos

Major intersections

See also

References

Roads in Perth, Western Australia
Articles containing video clips